Direct Line with Vladimir Putin (Прямая линия с Владимиром Путиным) is an annual televised political event in Russia. As its name implies, it is a question and answer event with Russian President Vladimir Putin. The event is broadcast on television by Russia-1, Russia 24, RT and Channel One Russia, and on radio by Mayak, Vesti FM and Radio of Russia. It is supported and directed by the Kremlin Press Secretary.

During Putin's Premiership the event was called Talk with Vladimir Putin. The Continuation (Разговор с Владимиром Путиным. Продолжение).

A similar programme existed during the presidency of Dmitry Medvedev, titled Talk with Dmitry Medvedev (Разговор с Дмитрием Медведевым).

Format
Over the course of the event, Putin answers questions from Russian citizens about politics, policy, and current events, asked over telephone, texts, email, and video calls. Through the programme, Putin presents himself as able to address the concerns of Russians himself, without the assistance of other government agencies and assemblies.

External links
Official website of the First show from 2001 
Official Homepage 
Russian President Vladimir Putin's Annual Call-In Program

2001 in Russian television
2001 Russian television series debuts
Russian television talk shows
2000s Russian television series
2010s Russian television series
2020s Russian television series
Vladimir Putin